Edgar Dean Crumpacker (May 27, 1851 – May 19, 1920) was an American lawyer and politician who served eight terms as a U.S. Representative from Indiana from 1897 to 1913. He was the father of Maurice Edgar Crumpacker and cousin of Shepard J. Crumpacker, Jr..

Biography
Born in Westville, Indiana, Crumpacker attended the common schools and Valparaiso Academy, Valparaiso, Indiana.
He studied law in the law department of Indiana University at Bloomington.
He was admitted to the bar in 1876 and commenced practice in Valparaiso, Indiana.
He served as prosecuting attorney for the thirty-first judicial district of Indiana 1884–1888.
He served as appellate judge, by appointment of Governor Hovey, from March 1891 to January 1, 1893.

Congress 
Crumpacker was elected as a Republican to the Fifty-fifth and to the seven succeeding Congresses (March 4, 1897 – March 3, 1913).

He served as chairman of the Committee on the Census (Fifty-eighth through Sixty-first Congresses). In 1901, before his chairmanship, he attempted to invoke Section 2 of the 14th Amendment to reduce Southern states' representation in the House of Representatives because of their suppression of African American voters.

Specifically, Crumpacker wanted to reduce Louisiana's House seats from 7 to 4, Mississippi's from 7 to 4, North Carolina's from 9 to 6, and South Carolina's from 6 to 4. All four of those states had passed state constitutions making it nearly impossible for African Americans to vote. Crumpacker's motion to consider revising state apportionments was defeated, 94–136.

He was an unsuccessful candidate for reelection in 1912 to the Sixty-third Congress.

Later career and death 
He resumed the practice of law in Valparaiso, Indiana, where he died May 19, 1920.
He was interred in Graceland Cemetery.

References

External links
 

1851 births
1920 deaths
Indiana state court judges
People from Valparaiso, Indiana
Republican Party members of the United States House of Representatives from Indiana